Richard Beers Loos  (October 4, 1860 – March 6, 1944), was an American journalist and newspaper publisher. His daughter was Anita Loos, a playwright and author who wrote, among other titles, Gentlemen Prefer Blondes.

Biography

Loos most often used the shortened form of his name for official work, R. Beers Loos.

R. Beers Loos married Minerva Ellen "Minnie" Smith. The couple had three children, including Anita. The family lived near Sisson, California (today Mount Shasta). At that time, Loos owned a local newspaper called the Sisson Mascot.

Most accounts indicate that he moved from Sisson to San Francisco in 1892. R. Beers Loos' whereabouts on December 5 that year are exactly known, witnessed by primary sources. On that date, Loos penned a letter in response to then-Governor of California, H. H. Markham, to present facts and opinion regarding a local murder case. Markham had evidently solicited information from Loos after receiving letters both in favor of and against the pardon of the inmate charged with the crime, Frank Cochran, who was being held at San Quentin prison. The date line of the letter reads "Sisson" and end of the letter reads "Sisson Mascot," seemingly indicating he still had an interest in the Northern California newspaper as of late 1892.

American male journalists
Journalists from California
American newspaper publishers (people)
1944 deaths
1860 births
People from Mount Shasta, California